The Adventures of Elmo in Grouchland is a 1999 American musical adventure comedy film directed by Gary Halvorson in his feature film debut. This was the second film to be based on the children's television series Sesame Street, after Sesame Street Presents: Follow That Bird (1985). It stars Mandy Patinkin and Vanessa Williams alongside Muppet performers Kevin Clash, Jerry Nelson, Frank Oz, and Steve Whitmire.

Produced by Jim Henson Pictures and Children's Television Workshop, the film was released by Columbia Pictures on October 1, 1999. The film received generally positive reviews from critics, but was a box office bomb, grossing $12 million against a budget of more than $26 million.

The film was one of the few Sesame Street productions directly produced by The Jim Henson Company. Alongside Muppets from Space (which was released the same year), this was the final Muppet feature film to involve Oz, who retired from being a full-time puppeteer the following year. This was also the final theatrical Muppet film to feature Caroll Spinney before his retirement in 2018 and his death in 2019, and the final Sesame Street film to feature Emilio Delgado and Bob McGrath before their deaths in 2022.

Plot 
One day, Elmo plays with his blanket in his bedroom. He spills orange juice on his blanket and takes it to the laundromat where he runs into his friend Zoe. Zoe wants to hold the blanket, but Elmo does not consent to sharing it, resulting in a tug of war that causes it to rip. Telly Monster, rollerskating out of control, comes and accidentally swipes the blanket leading to a chase around Sesame Street. The blanket ends up falling into the hands of Oscar the Grouch, who sneezes on it and drops it in his trash can. Elmo dives into the bottom of Oscar's trash can, where he finds his blanket snagged on a door.

Attempting to retrieve it, he and his blanket are then teleported through a colorful swirling tunnel to Grouchland, a city filled with Grouches, trash, and Huxley, a greedy man who loves to steal anything he comes across, including Elmo's blanket. A kind Grouch girl named Grizzy tells Elmo that his blanket is in Huxley's castle at the top of the faraway Mount Pickanose. A plant named Stuckweed encourages Elmo that he will make it if he just takes his first step, so Elmo sets out on a quest to retrieve his blanket.

With Oscar's help, the Sesame Street residents go to Grouchland to find Elmo, but when they encounter a Grouch police officer for help, they end up arrested as they are informed that it is against the law to ask for help in Grouchland.

Huxley has his bug sidekick, Bug and his minions, the Pesties, trap Elmo in a tunnel. Elmo gets out with the help of fireflies. Huxley then has Bug and the Pesties misdirect Elmo into a garbage dump where he is brought before the Queen of Trash for trespassing. The Queen tests him, requesting that he blows 100 raspberries for her in 30 seconds. Elmo succeeds with some help from the audience and the Queen allows him to pass through. Huxley sends in a huge pet chicken to stop Elmo, who tosses Elmo far away. Elmo decides to give up on retrieving his blanket for the night. Meanwhile, Grizzy sneaks into the jail where she informs Elmo's friends that he has gone to Huxley's castle. After admitting that Elmo is his friend, Oscar convinces all the Grouches to cooperate, since it is the only way they can stop Huxley from stealing any more of their trash. The police officer releases the Sesame Street residents so they and the Grouches can go to Huxley's castle to fight for their trash and rescue Elmo.

Early the next morning, a caterpillar wakes Elmo up and convinces him that he has what it takes to be brave. Elmo then arrives at Huxley's castle and rescues his blanket as Huxley sends the Pesties to stop him. Elmo falls into a basket as Huxley decides to make him and his blanket both his property by using a claw to put them on his conveyor stamper. The Sesame Street and Grouchland citizens arrive and Huxley tries to escape with Elmo's blanket, only to have the blanket sucked up with the vacuum cleaner nozzle on his helicopter. Elmo launches a basket over Huxley's shoulders, incapacitating him. Bug is revealed to be at the controls of the helicopter, and refuses Huxley's demand for the blanket, instead returning it to Elmo. Elmo returns to Sesame Street with his friends, where he apologizes to Zoe and allows her to hold his blanket. She accepts his apology, agreeing that they can resume their friendship. Elmo says goodbye to the audience, thanking them for helping.

Throughout the movie, Bert and Ernie serve as hosts, and interrupt the film at certain points to explain things to the audience.

Cast

Muppet performers 

 Kevin Clash as Elmo, Lyle, The Grouch Jailer, The Grouch Taxicab Driver and Various Grouches
 Fran Brill as Zoe, Tanya, Prairie Dawn and Various Grouches
 Stephanie D'Abruzzo as Grizzy and M'Lady
 Dave Goelz as the Humongous Chicken and the Mouse
 Joseph Mazzarino as Bug and the Grouch Chef
 Jerry Nelson as Count, Howard, Mayor Grouchberg, Grouch Cop and Mr. Johnson
 Carmen Osbahr as Rosita 
 Martin P. Robinson as Telly, Little Ricky and the Laundromat Manager
 David Rudman as Baby Bear, Caterpillar, Sydney, Colander Stenchman, The Grouch Customer, Mr. Johnson (Assistant), The Alarm Clock Bird and Various Grouches
 Caroll Spinney as Big Bird and Oscar
 Steve Whitmire as Ernie, Stuckweed, Football Stenchman, Bad Humor Man, Sharon Groan and the Parrot
 Frank Oz as Bert, Grover and Cookie Monster

Additional characters performed by: Drew Allison, Bruce Lanoil, Bill Barretta, Bob Lynch, John Boone, Ed May, R. Lee Bryan, Tim Parati, Leslie Carrara, Annie Peterle, Lisa Consolo, Andy Stone, Jodi Eichelberger, Lisa Sturz, Rowell Gormon, Kirk Thatcher, Mary Harrison, Matt Vogel, Rob Killen and Matt Yates

Humans of Sesame Street 

 Sonia Manzano as Maria Rodriguez
 Roscoe Orman as Gordon Robinson
 Alison Bartlett-O'Reilly as Gina Jefferson
 Ruth Buzzi as Ruthie
 Emilio Delgado as Luis Rodriguez
 Loretta Long as Susan Robinson
 Bob McGrath as Bob Johnson

Other humans 
 Mandy Patinkin as Huxley
 Vanessa Williams as the Queen of Trash

Production

Casting 

All the puppeteers who performed the primary Sesame Street characters (such as Kevin Clash, Jerry Nelson, Caroll Spinney and Fran Brill) were called to Wilmington, North Carolina for the table read on May 19, 1998. The regular puppets were used for the normal Sesame Street characters, and puppets for assorted Grouches (including Grizzy) were designed and built by Mark Zezsotek. Paul Andrejco, Muppet designer for Bear in the Big Blue House, also designed Humungous Chicken. Sonia Manzano reprised her role as Maria and Roscoe Orman reprised his role as Gordon. Vanessa Williams was cast as the Queen of Trash and the hairstylist colored her hair green for the role. Mandy Patinkin was a last-minute replacement for the original actor hired to play Huxley. For the role, the makeup artist designed false eyebrows for Patinkin to wear to make him seem like he had bushier eyebrows than normal.

Filming 
The film was shot over a 30-day period (starting May 26, 1998) at the EUE/Screen Gems studio in Wilmington. The set was raised so that puppeteers would be able to stand up instead of squatting below street level like usual. Filming wrapped and visual effects by D.Rez were added during the following month, and the Ernie and Bert scenes were later shot in New York in 1999, with Matt Vogel assisting Steve Whitmire in performing Ernie and Eric Jacobson assisting Frank Oz with Bert.

Music

Songs 
 "Together Forever" – Elmo, Blanket, Frazzle, Big Bird, Rosita, Prairie Dawn, Hoots The Owl, Count von Count, Baby Bear, Sock Quartet, Savin, Celina, Miles, Gabi, Gordon, Gina, Susan, Luis, Jamal, Angela, Bob  (Written by Michael Silversher and Patty Silversher; produced by Jeff Elmassian and Siedah Garrett)
 "Welcome to Grouchland" – The Grouchland Ensemble (Written by Martin Erskine and Seth Friedman; produced by Martin Erskine)
 "Take the First Step" – Stuckweed (Written by Michael Reagan and Greg Matheson; produced by Jeff Elmassian and Siedah Garrett)
 "Make It Mine" – Mandy Patinkin, Fran Brill, Stephanie D’Abruzzo, Kevin Clash, Ivy Austin (Written by Martin Erskine and Seth Friedman; produced by Martin Erskine)
 "I See a Kingdom" – Vanessa Williams (Written by Siedah Garrett, Jeff Elmassian, and Andy Rehfeldt; produced by Jeff Elmassian and Siedah Garrett)
 "Precious Wings" – Tatyana Ali (Written by Siedah Garrett, Jeff Elmassian, and Andy Rehfeldt; produced by Keith Thomas)

Soundtrack 

This album, released in 1999, is the soundtrack to The Adventures of Elmo in Grouchland.

This album won the Grammy Award for Best Musical Album for Children in 2000.

"Make It Mine" is excluded from the soundtrack.

Track list 
 "Together Forever"
 "Welcome to Grouchland"
 "Take the First Step"
 "I See a Kingdom" - Vanessa Williams
 "Precious Wings" - Tatyana Ali
 Elmo Tells His Grouchland Story (Spoken Word)
 "The Grouch Song" - Elmo, Grizzy, Oscar the Grouch (Written by Jeff Moss)
 "There's a Big Heap of Trash at the End of the Rainbow" - The Stenchmen (Written by Tony Geiss)
 "I Love Trash" - Steven Tyler

Reception

Critical response 
The film has a rating of 77% on Rotten Tomatoes based on 43 reviews, with an average rating of 6.72/10. The film's consensus states, "This fun and moral tale entertains both first-time Sesame Street watchers and seasoned veterans." On Metacritic, which uses an average of critics' reviews, the film holds a 59/100, indicating "mixed or average reviews".

Box office 
The Adventures of Elmo in Grouchland was the only family film playing in most theaters at the time of its release. Sony had planned a scaled-back release, making it difficult to make its money back. The film opened at No. 8 with a weekend gross of $3,255,033 from 1,210 theaters, averaging $2,690 per venue. In total, The Adventures of Elmo in Grouchland earned back less than half its $26 million budget, grossing $11,683,047 during its two-and-a-half-month theatrical run. It is currently the lowest-grossing Muppet film to date.

Home media 
On December 21, 1999, the film was released on VHS and DVD by Columbia TriStar Home Video. In 2007, the film was released as part of a double feature with Thomas and the Magic Railroad.

Book series 
The film inspired a trilogy of children's books, published in 1999: Happy Grouchy Day, The Grouchiest Lovey, and Unwelcome to Grouchland. The book series was written by Suzanne Weyn and illustrated by Tom Brannon.

See also 
 The Adventures of Elmo in Grouchland (video game)

Notes

References

External links 

 
 
 
 
 
 
 

1999 films
1990s English-language films
1990s adventure comedy films
1990s children's comedy films
1990s fantasy adventure films
1990s musical comedy films
1990s children's films
American adventure comedy films
American children's adventure films
American children's comedy films
American children's fantasy films
American fantasy adventure films
American musical comedy films
American musical fantasy films
Puppet films
Films set in New York City
Films shot in New York City
Films shot in North Carolina
Films scored by John Debney
Columbia Pictures films
The Jim Henson Company films
Sesame Street features
1999 directorial debut films
1999 comedy films
1990s American films